Jodi Cobb is an American photographer, living in Washington, D.C. She was named White House Photographer of the Year in 1985, and has received awards from Pictures of the Year International, World Press Photo and the National Press Photographers Association.

Education
Cobb received a Master of Arts and Bachelor of Journalism degrees from the University of Missouri, and an honorary Doctor of Fine Arts from the Corcoran College of Art and Design.

Life and work
She was the only woman on staff photographer in National Geographic history and has been featured in over 30 National Geographic stories. Her work has brought her to over 60 countries, including China, where she was one of the first photographers to travel across the country.

Publications

Books of work by Cobb
Geisha: the Life, the Voices, the Art. New York: Knopf, 1995. . With an introduction by Ian Buruma.
Revised edition, 1998

Books with contributions by Cobb
The Wall: Images and Offerings from the Vietnam Veterans Memorial. San Francisco: Collins Pub, 1987. .
The Way Home: Ending Homelessness in America. By Nan Roman. New York: Harry N. Abrams, 1999. .
20th Century Photographers: Interviews on the Craft, Purpose, and the Passion of Photography. Abingdon-on-Thames, UK: Routledge, 2014. By Grace Schaub. .

Awards
1985: White House Photographer of the Year
1986: 3rd prize, Daily Life, Stories category, World Press Photo, Amsterdam
2004: First Place, Magazine Division  /  General News Reporting, Pictures of the Year International
2012: Missouri Honor Medal for Distinguished Service in Journalism, Missouri School of Journalism, University of Missouri, Columbia, MO

Geisha: the Life, the Voices, the Art was nominated for the Pulitzer Prize and was a winner of the Outstanding Achievement Award from the American Society of Media Photographers.

References

External links
 

20th-century births
Year of birth missing (living people)
Living people
University of Missouri alumni
National Geographic photographers
20th-century American photographers
21st-century American photographers
20th-century American women photographers
21st-century American women photographers
Women photojournalists